Amanda Randles is an American computer scientist who is the Alfred Winborne and Victoria Stover Mordecai Assistant Professor of Biomedical Sciences at Duke University. Randles has been an assistant professor of biomedical engineering and computer science at the university and works at the Duke Cancer Institute. Her research interests include biomedical simulation and high-performance computing.

Early career and education
In high school, Randles attended the Utica Center for Math, Science, and Technology, where she learned computer programming and its applications in the sciences. She also participated in Science Olympiad and FIRST Robotics.

Randles attended Duke University, where she completed a B.A. in physics and computer science in 2005. After working for three years as a software developer on the IBM Blue Gene project, she went to Harvard University to earn an S.M. in computer science (2010) and a PhD in applied physics (2013) advised by Efthimios Kaxiras and Hanspeter Pfister. In 2011, she was awarded a Computational Science Graduate Fellowship by the Krell Institute. She subsequently completed a practicum at Lawrence Livermore National Laboratory and was a visiting scientist at Franziska Michor's laboratory in the Dana–Farber Cancer Institute.

Academic career
Randles joined the Duke University Biomedical Engineering Department in 2015, where she is currently serving as the Alfred Winborne and Victoria Stover Mordecai Assistant Professor of Biomedical Sciences. She has been an assistant professor of biomedical engineering, computer science, and works at the Duke Cancer Institute. Randles was also an assistant professor of mathematics from 2016 to 2019.

Research
Randles' research interests are biomedical simulation and high-performance computing; specifically, her focus is developing computational tools that can examine the behavior of different diseases, from atherosclerosis to cancer. Randles and her research group have developed fluid dynamics simulation software capable of modeling blood flowing throughout a human body based on full-body CT and MRI scans, dubbed HARVEY after the physician William Harvey. Possible applications include examining how different medical interventions in cardiovascular disease impact the circulatory system and modeling the flow of singular cancer cells through the system.

In 2018, Randles was one of ten researchers selected to test simulation-based projects on the Aurora exascale supercomputer in 2021, as part of the Aurora Early Science Program at the Argonne National Laboratory. She was awarded an NSF CAREER Award in May 2020 to support her work on HARVEY.

Awards and honors
In 2014, Randles was awarded the NIH Director's Early Independence Award. She was named to the 2015 World Economic Forum Young Scientist List for her work on the "design of large-scale parallel applications targeting problems in physics". In 2017, she was awarded the Grace Murray Hopper Award and was later named to the MIT Technology Review Innovators Under 35, both given for her work on HARVEY.

Selected publications

References

External links
 Amanda Randles at Duke University
 Randles Lab at the Pratt School of Engineering
 

Living people
American computer scientists
American women engineers
Duke University alumni
Harvard University alumni
Duke University faculty
21st-century American engineers
21st-century women engineers
Grace Murray Hopper Award laureates
Year of birth missing (living people)
American women academics
21st-century American women